AIU may refer to:
 Akita International University, an English-language public university in Akita, Japan
 AlAlamein International University, a national University in New Alamein, Egypt
 Allegheny Intermediate Unit, a branch of the Pennsylvania Department of Education
 Alliance Israélite Universelle, a Jewish educational and civil rights organization based in Paris
 Alliant International University, an American for-profit university based in San Diego, California
 American Idol Underground, former name of Artist Underground
 American InterContinental University, an American for-profit university
 American Industrial Union, a short-lived labor organization established in 1895
 American International Underwriters, former name of AIU Holdings, a subsidiary of American International Group
 American International University (disambiguation), several universities around the world
 Approximately Infinite Universe, a double album by Yoko Ono
 Association of Indian Universities, association of major universities in India
 Atlantic International University, a distance-learning university based in Hawaii
 Athletics Integrity Unit, a body founded by the International Association of Athletics Federations to combat doping in athletics